Sam Hanna (portrayed by LL Cool J) is a fictional character in the show NCIS: Los Angeles. He is a former U.S. Navy SEAL and a Senior NCIS Special Agent. He first appeared in the NCIS season six episode "Legend (Part I)".

Background and characterization 
The son of Marine Colonel Raymond Hanna, Osama "Sam" Hanna attended a military school and excelled in football, playing wide receiver. Like the actor, Hanna is a native of New York City.

Outside his job, Hanna has a varied range of interests, including boxing, origami, acting, vinyl records, and antique cars. He also tends to follow the latest health food and fitness fads. He suffers from coulrophobia (fear of clowns) and has a fear of maggots.

Family 
Michelle is first introduced in the season 4 episode "Rude Awakenings". It is revealed that they fell in love when they worked together on a failed Joint Task Force mission to capture Isaak Sidorov, a Russian arms dealer. She had managed to successfully infiltrate Sidorov's organization as an assassin-for-hire under the alias of "Quinn" before Sidorov escaped and the mission was aborted.

Military and NCIS career 
Prior to joining NCIS, Hanna served in the U.S. Navy, from which he retired with the rank of Senior Chief Petty Officer (E-8), although this contradicts his service record as shown in the episode "Betrayal" which states that he left as a Chief Petty officer (E-7). When in uniform in the 20th episode of season 4, he is seen wearing the rank of a Senior Chief. He was a member of the Special Warfare Development Group (DEVGRU) (formerly "Team Six") based in Dam Neck in Virginia. Despite his inability to swim when he first enlisted, he went on to have a distinguished career as a SEAL and various characters have referenced his "legendary" status within the SEAL community. Much of his career is vague due to the highly classified nature of most of his missions, although it has been mentioned that he served in Bosnia (Yugoslav Wars), Chad (Pan Sahel Initiative), Iraq and Afghanistan and was stationed at the Naval Special Warfare Center in Coronado at some point. His area of expertise is the Middle East and he reads and speaks Arabic fluently and has an encyclopedic knowledge of the Qur'an. He is also multilingual, having a working knowledge of Japanese, Persian, Danish, Hebrew, Korean, and Spanish. Due to his background in the SEALs, he is able to withstand torture due to SERE training required for all special forces operators and detach himself emotionally during investigations. Although usually reticent about his service, Sam has hinted several times about how his experiences overseas has affected him: he mentions about getting help in "Field of Fire" when interviewing a homeless veteran who was distrustful of him and admits to Nate Getz in the episode "Impact" of his worries that he would one day lose himself.

Hanna has a strong sense of duty and becomes particularly indignant when the criminal is from a military background. In the episode "Vengeance", he was forced to interrogate a group of SEALs about their involvement in the death of a Navy officer suspected of leaking classified information and was visibly affected, leading Hetty to observe that she felt like she was "making him interrogate his family". In the final episode of season 11, "Code of Conduct", when investigating claims that a SEAL chief petty officer has murdered an unarmed prisoner, it is revealed that Sam is widely known and respected long even after his service ended, with multiple SEALs willing to defy their chief's orders after he reveals his presence.

In the two-part crossover episode with Hawaii Five-0 it is revealed that he is friends with head of the Five-0 Task Force and former SEAL Lieutenant Commander Steve McGarrett, although the story of how they met has yet to be addressed.

Storylines 

In the season two finale, Hanna resigns from NCIS along with Callen and Kensi in order to follow Hetty's trail to Prague without Director Vance's authorization. It is revealed in the episode "Greed" that Hanna has been working undercover on a joint CIA task force in Sudan for the past year. His teammates had already been suspicious due to Hanna uncharacteristically turning up late for work and taking leaves of absence. During the investigation he crosses paths with fellow undercover operative Michael, and Hanna said that he "pulled some strings" to get them into the USA. In this episode, Hanna is once again hunted by the Taliban. Later, it was revealed that Amir was working for a terrorist named Habib. His mission is to kill Sam, "the one that got away". Sam was trapped inside their boat shed and beaten up by Habib's men with Callen, Kensi and Deeks launching a rescue operation which was successful, resulting in the deaths of the terrorists. Throughout the episode, Callen and Hetty are worried because Hanna is personally involved in the case. Hetty "punishes" Sam for using federal resources, once again, by buying expensive Scotch at his expense.

Michelle is reactivated after NCIS, FBI and CIA discover that Sidorov has stolen three Cold War-era nuclear devices from former KGB sleeper agents in the United States. She confides to Sam that she misses her undercover work when he expresses his disapproval about her desire to return to active duty. In the season four finale, Sam is partnered with Deeks who confronts him over his indifference towards him. Hanna admits to Deeks that he has some personal flaws. Later, Deeks saves Hanna's life and ends up captured and tortured by Sidorov. In the season five premiere 'Ascension', after being found by Kensi and Granger, Deeks tells Hanna he didn't give up Michelle even under torture. Hanna visits him, stating he now owes him for the rest of his life for what Deeks did for him and Michelle. When Deeks admits he was thinking about quitting, Hanna said it would be a mistake, saying that Deeks is a great cop. In the following episode "Impact", Hanna is sent for mandatory counseling with Nate Getz by Hetty. Hanna explains that he is able to detach himself when tortured and then bring himself back to reality once it is over but is worried that there will come a day when he is unable to go back to reality.

In the episode before the season 8 finale Michelle is murdered, leaving him devastated. The team had tracked her down after her abduction but found her too late. Season 9 sees Hanna coping with his grief while struggling to remain professional. LL Cool J commented on Hanna's state of mind: "He has a single minded focus and he wants to get to the people that did this and deal with them."

In season 9, Sam sells his home with his kids away at Boarding school, puts his stuff into storage and buys a boat, which he renames Michelle, in honor of his wife. He still struggles with his grief when his anniversary came around and ended up hungover the next day. Callen helps him through his grief and by Season 10, when he suspects Sam has an interest in fellow NCIS Agent Nicole Dechamps (Marsha Thomason), he tells him Michelle would want him to be happy and move on with his life. Eventually, in Season 11, Sam starts to date Katherine Casillas (Moon Bloodgood), a feisty insurance broker who helps NCIS out with cases involving finances and high-class cases.

Awards and decorations 
The following are the medals and service awards fictionally worn by Senior Chief Hanna.

References 

Black people in television
Crossover characters in television
Fictional African-American people
Fictional characters from New York City
Television characters introduced in 2009
Fictional Gulf War veterans
Fictional Iraq War veterans
Fictional Muslims
Fictional Naval Criminal Investigative Service personnel
Fictional polyglots
Fictional United States Navy SEALs personnel
Fictional War in Afghanistan (2001–2021) veterans
Fictional Yugoslav War veterans
Islam in fiction
NCIS (TV series) characters
NCIS: Los Angeles characters